Dennis Clay Powell (born August 13, 1963), is an American former professional baseball pitcher, who played in Major League Baseball for the Los Angeles Dodgers, Seattle Mariners, and Milwaukee Brewers, in all or parts of eight seasons (–).

As a big league hitter, Powell had three hits — all doubles — in 17 at bats (owing to the fact that he played mostly in the American League, during the designated hitter era), for a .176 batting average. The fact that all three of Powell’s hits were two-baggers ties him with Earl Hersh and Verdo Elmore for the most hits in a major league career in which all the player’s hits were doubles.

External links

Dennis Powell at Baseball Gauge
Dennis Powell at Pura Pelota (Venezuelan Professional Baseball League)

1963 births
Living people
African-American baseball players
Albuquerque Dukes players
American expatriate baseball players in Canada
American expatriate baseball players in Japan
American expatriate baseball players in Mexico
Baseball players from Georgia (U.S. state)
Calgary Cannons players
Denver Zephyrs players
Gulf Coast Dodgers players
Kintetsu Buffaloes players
Leones del Caracas players
American expatriate baseball players in Venezuela
Los Angeles Dodgers players
Major League Baseball pitchers
Mexican League baseball pitchers
Milwaukee Brewers players
Nashville Sounds players
Nippon Professional Baseball pitchers
People from Moultrie, Georgia
Piratas de Campeche players
Rochester Red Wings players
San Antonio Dodgers players
Seattle Mariners players
Sultanes de Monterrey players
Tiburones de La Guaira players
Vero Beach Dodgers players
21st-century African-American people
20th-century African-American sportspeople